German submarine U-750 was a German Type VIIC submarine U-boat built for Nazi Germany's Kriegsmarine for service during World War II.

Design
German Type VIIC submarines were preceded by the shorter Type VIIB submarines. U-750 had a displacement of  when at the surface and  while submerged. She had two shafts and two  propellers.

U-750 was fitted with five  torpedo tubes (four fitted at the bow and one at the stern), fourteen torpedoes, one  SK C/35 naval gun, 220 rounds, and two twin  C/30 anti-aircraft guns. The boat had a complement of between forty-four and sixty.

Service history
Work on U-750 began on 29 September 1942 as yard number 1560 of the F Schichau GmbH in the former Free City of Danzig. She was commissioned on 26 August 1943, under the command of Tenente di vascello Emerico Siriani and trained with the 8th U-boat Flotilla until 8 September 1943. On 29 September 1943 however, Emerico Siriani was replaced by Oberleutnant zur See Georg von Bitter, then on 1 September 1944 by Oberleutnant zur See Justus Grawert, who would command her for the rest of her service career.

On 1 April 1945, U-750 was moved to the 5th U-boat Flotilla, but remained as a training boat until she was scuttled on 5 May 1945.

References

Bibliography

External links

U-boats commissioned in 1943
1943 ships
World War II submarines of Germany
Ships built in Danzig
German Type VIIC submarines
Ships built by Schichau
Operation Regenbogen (U-boat)
Maritime incidents in May 1945